The 1983 Arizona State Sun Devils football team was an American football team that represented Arizona State University in the Pacific-10 Conference (Pac-10) during the 1983 NCAA Division I-A football season. In their fourth season under head coach Darryl Rogers, the Sun Devils compiled a 6–4–1 record (3–3–1 against Pac-10 opponents), finished in a tie for sixth place in the Pac-10, and outscored their opponents by a combined total of 320 to 200.

The team's statistical leaders included Tod Hons with 2,394 passing yards, Darryl Clack with 932 rushing yards, and Don Kern with 502 receiving yards.

Schedule

Personnel

References

Arizona State
Arizona State Sun Devils football seasons
Arizona State Sun Devils football